The King James Only movement  (also known as King James Onlyism) asserts the belief that the King James Version (KJV) of the Bible is superior to all other translations of the Bible. Adherents of the King James Only movement, mostly members of Conservative Anabaptist, Conservative Holiness Methodist, and some Baptist churches, believe that the KJV needs no further improvements because it is the greatest English translation of the Bible which was ever published, and they also believe that all other English translations of the Bible which were published after the KJV was published are corrupt.

These assertions are generally based upon a preference for the Byzantine text-type or the Textus Receptus and they are also based upon a distrust of the Alexandrian text-type or the critical texts of Nestle-Aland, and Westcott-Hort, on which the majority of twentieth- and twenty-first-century translations of the Bible are based.

Variations 
Christian apologist James White has divided the King James Only movement into five main classifications:

 "I Like the KJV Best" – Although White lists this point of view as a subdivision of the KJVO group, this is disputed by some. This group simply regards the KJV as a very good translation and prefers it over other translations because the church which they attend uses it, has always used it, or prefers its style, or the individual person uses it, or has always used it, or prefers its style. 
 "The Textual Argument" – This group believes that the KJV's Hebrew and Greek textual base is more accurate than the alternative texts used by newer translations. Many in this group might accept a modern Bible version based on the same Greek and Hebrew manuscripts which are used in the KJV. White claims that Zane C. Hodges was a member of this group.  Hodges considered that the Majority Text "corrects" the Received Text.   
 "Textus Receptus Only"/"Received Text Only" – This group holds the position that the traditional Greek texts represented in the Textus Receptus were supernaturally (or providentially) preserved and that other Greek manuscripts not used in this compilation may be flawed. The KJV is viewed as an exemplary English translation that is based on this Greek grouping of Bible manuscripts put together by Desiderius Erasmus, but it is also believed that other translations based on these texts have the potential to be of equal quality. The views of the Trinitarian Bible Society fit into this TRO division. The Trinitarian Bible Society does not believe that the Authorized Version (KJV) is a perfect translation, only that it is the best available translation in the English language. The Society believes this text is superior to the texts used by the United Bible Societies and other Bible publishers, which use texts that incorporate as their basis a relatively few manuscripts from the 4th century, and some going back to the early 2nd century.
 "The Inspired KJV Group" – This faction believes that the KJV itself was divinely inspired. They view the translation to be an English preservation of the very words of God and that they are as accurate as the original Greek and Hebrew manuscripts found in its underlying texts. Often this group excludes other English versions based on the same manuscripts, claiming that the KJV is the only English Bible sanctioned by God and should never be changed. White believes most KJV-Onlyists would belong to this group.
 "The KJV As New Revelation" – This group claims that the KJV is a "new revelation" or "advanced revelation" from God, and it should be the standard from which all other translations originate. Adherents to this belief may also believe that the original languages, Hebrew and Greek, can be corrected by the KJV. This view is often called "Ruckmanism" after Peter Ruckman, a staunch advocate of this view.

These classifications are not mutually exclusive, nor are they a comprehensive summary describing those who prefer the KJV. Douglas Wilson, for instance, argues that the KJV (or, in his preferred terminology, the Authorized Version) is superior because of its manuscript tradition, its translational philosophy (with updates to the language being regularly necessary), and its ecclesiastical authority, having been created by the church and authorized for use in the church.

Although not expressly "King James Only", The Church of Jesus Christ of Latter-day Saints recommends the Latter-day Saint edition of the King James Version of the Bible.

History
Benjamin G. Wilkinson (1872–1968), a Seventh-day Adventist missionary, theology professor and college president, wrote Our Authorized Bible Vindicated (1930) in which he asserted that some of the new versions of the Bible came from manuscripts with corruptions introduced into the Septuagint by Origen and manuscripts with deletions and changes from corrupted Alexandrian text. He criticized Westcott and Hort, believing they intentionally rejected the use of the Textus Receptus and made changes to the text used in translation using their revised Greek text based mainly on the Codex Vaticanus and Codex Sinaiticus.

Gail Riplinger (born 1947) has also addressed the issue of differences in current editions of the King James Bible in some detail. A lengthy critical review of her book New Age Bible Versions, originally published in Cornerstone magazine in 1994, authored by Bob and Gretchen Passantino of Answers in Action, described the book as "erroneous, sensationalistic, misrepresentative, inaccurate, and logically indefensible".

Jack Chick (1924–2016), a fundamentalist Christian who was best known for his comic tracts, advocated a King James Only position. His comic Sabotage portrayed a Christian whose faith was shipwrecked by the rejection of the King James Version as the Word of God, only to be rescued by another character's defense of the King James Version.

Joey Faust, a Baptist pastor and researcher, is the author of The Word: God Will Keep It: The 400 Year History of the King James Bible Only Movement which documents a number of KJV Only proponents throughout history.

The 2015 Manual of the Bible Missionary Church, a Methodist denomination in the conservative holiness movement, states: "We wholeheartedly endorse the use of the Authorized Version (King James Version) of the Bible as the final authority in our English-speaking churches and schools. We also go on record as being opposed to the Revised Standard Version of the Bible, The Living Bible, the New English Translation of the Bible, the Reader's Digest Condensed Version, the New International Version and the public use of other modern versions."

The Church Polity of the Dunkard Brethren Church, a Conservative Anabaptist denomination in the Schwarzenau Brethren tradition, states: "To aid in Scripture memorization among our members and our children, to help avoid confusion and to promote sound doctrine in our services, the Authorized King James Version of the Bible shall be used in our Sunday School, Bible Study, and church services. Exceptions may be made where languages other than English are necessary."

Agapé Boarding School in Missouri endorsed the King James Only position. One student said that when he first arrived at the school, he was strip-searched and his Bible was thrown in the trash because it was not a KJV.

Other organizations and individuals promoting the KJV Only include:

 Alamo Christian Foundation
 Andersonville Theological Seminary
 Bible Missionary Church
 Dial-the-Truth Ministries
 Steven Anderson, the founder and the pastor of Faithful Word Baptist Church and the founder of the New Independent Fundamentalist Baptist movement
 Faithful Word Baptist Church
 David Otis Fuller
 Kent Hovind
 Dave Hunt (Christian apologist)
 Jack Hyles
 Hyles-Anderson College
 Texe Marrs
 NIFB movement
 Michael Pearl
 Pensacola Christian College
 Peter Ruckman

 Shelton Smith
 The Shepherd's Chapel. It adheres to Christian Identity and it is also KJV only.
 Jimmy Swaggart
 The Sword of the Lord
 Trinitarian Bible Society
 Westboro Baptist Church
 West Coast Baptist College
 WGCR

Arguments 

KJV onlyists often criticize how new versions do not feature some verses that are found in the KJV. For example, some of the verses in John 5 and John 7 are left out from modern versions.

1 John 5:7 
Most new versions do not have the Johannine Comma ("the Father, the Word, and the Holy Ghost: and these three are one"), because it is not found in any of the earliest manuscripts. However KJV onlyists often defend this reading by quoting early church fathers, who sometimes used phrases similar to the reading. This reading is also defended by claiming corruption of the early texts, such as the Sinaiticus. KJV onlyists have also claimed that the absence of the reading causes a grammatical error in the Greek.

For example Cyprian seemed to quote the comma, and this has been used by KJV onlyists to defend the verse:

Acts 8:37 
Most new versions do not have Acts 8:37, because it is not found in the earliest manuscripts. KJV onlyists will also defend the verse by using quotes from early church fathers, such as Irenaeus, who seemed to know the verse, which predate the earliest manuscripts available:

Hades 
The KJV translates  and  both as "hell", unlike modern versions of the bible which transliterate  as 'Hades'. KJV onlyists criticize that the idea of Hades being separate from hell is an idea from Paganism and not biblical.

Textus Receptus vs the Alexandrian Text 
KJV onlyists often claim that the Alexandrian text-type is corrupted. KJV onlyists cite early church fathers as evidence for the corruption of the Alexandrian texts, for example Origen is cited to have said that changes were made in the manuscripts. KJV onlyists will argue that older readings are not necessarily better.

B. G. Wilkinson at Washington Missionary College writes in his book Truth Triumphant:

John William Burgon opposed what he called the "two irresponsible scholars of the University of Cambridge" (Brooke Foss Westcott and Professor Fenton John Anthony Hort) and their revised Greek Text.

Septuagint 
KJV onlyists favour the Masoretic text over the Septuagint, and KJV onlyists sometimes argue against the common belief that the New Testament quoted the Septuagint.

Copyright 
KJV onlyists argue that copyright incentivizes Bible translators to make substantial changes to the Bible, in order to claim copyrights.

Criticism 

Archer, Blomberg and White are pious evangelicals, not liberal Bible scholars.

See also

 Bible translations
 Bible version debate
 Biblical criticism
 List of New Testament verses not included in modern English translations
 List of English Bible translations
 List of major textual variants in the New Testament
 Modern English Bible translations
 Sola scriptura
 Textual criticism
 Verbal plenary preservation

References

Bibliography
 .
 .

Further reading

External links
The Holy Bible: An Exact Reprint Page for Page of the Authorized Version Published in the Year MDCXI. Oxford: The University Press, 1833, "a scrupulous original-spelling, page-for-page, and line-for-line reprint of the 1611 edition (including all chapter headings, marginalia, and original italicization, but with Roman type substituted for the black letter of the original)" cited in Footnote d above. Complete pdf of the original book.

 
Bible-related controversies
Christian terminology